Nizhniye Peny is a rural locality (a selo) and the administrative center of Nizhnepenskoye Rural Settlement, Rakityansky District, Belgorod Oblast, Russia. The population was 990 as of 2010. There are 8 streets.

Geography 
Nizhniye Peny is located 30 km northeast of Rakitnoye (the district's administrative centre) by road. Dragunka is the nearest rural locality.

References 

Rural localities in Rakityansky District